The 1947 Santa Clara Broncos football team was an American football team that represented Santa Clara University as an independent during the 1947 college football season. In its second season under head coach Len Casanova, the team compiled a 4–4 record and was outscored by a total of 158 to 109. The team played its three home games at Kezar Stadium at San Francisco.

Schedule

References

Santa Clara
Santa Clara Broncos football seasons
Santa Clara Broncos football